Mihai Mocanu (24 February 1942 – 18 June 2009) was a Romanian football defender.

Club career
Mihai Mocanu was born on 24 February 1942 in Constanța, Romania, starting to play football in 1952 at local club, Locomotiva, afterwards going to play for Rafinăria Câmpina, returning to his hometown at Electrica where he finished his junior career, starting his senior career in Divizia B, playing for two seasons at SNM Constanța, afterwards going for one season at fellow Divizia B club, Chimia Făgăraș. He went to play for Petrolul Ploiești, making his Divizia A debut on 25 August 1963 in a 2–1 away loss against UTA Arad, making a total of 201 appearances with 6 goals scored in the competition over the course of 9 seasons in which he also helped the Yellow Wolves win the 1965–66 Divizia A, being used by coach Constantin Cernăianu in 26 matches. He played 3 games for Petrolul in the first round of the 1966–67 European Cup against Liverpool which include a 3–1 victory, however they did not manage to qualify to the next round and also he appeared in 6 games in which he scored one goal in the Inter-Cities Fairs Cup. After he made his last Divizia A appearance for Petrolul on 12 December 1971 in a 1–0 home loss against Jiul Petroșani, Mocanu went to play in Cyprus at Omonia Nicosia for two seasons with fellow Romanian, Constantin Frățilă, winning the title and the cup in 1974. He returned in Romania, playing another two seasons for Petrolul, this time in Divizia B, retiring in 1976. In July 2006, a part of Mocanu's right leg was amputated as he was diagnosed with ischemia, dying on 18 June 2009.

International career
Mihai Mocanu played 31 games at international level of Romania, making his debut on 1 June 1966 under coach Ilie Oană in a friendly which ended with a 1–0 loss against West Germany. He went on to play four games at the Euro 1968 qualifiers and two at the successful 1970 World Cup qualifiers, being used at the final tournament by coach Angelo Niculescu in all the minutes of the three group matches as Romania did not advance to the next stage and had a appreciated performance in the 3–2 loss against Brazil in the duel with his direct opponent, Jairzinho. He made three appearances at the 1972 Euro qualifiers, including his last appearance which took place on 22 September 1971 in a 4–0 away victory against Finland.

For representing his country at the 1970 World Cup, Mocanu was decorated by President of Romania Traian Băsescu on 25 March 2008 with the Ordinul "Meritul Sportiv" – (The Medal "The Sportive Merit") class III.

Managerial career
Mihai Mocanu coached Petrolul Ploiești for one year in Divizia B, also working at the center of children and juniors of the club, he also coached Steaua Mizil, Metalul Plopeni and Conpet Ploiești from 1991 until 2005, all of them in the Romanian lower leagues.

Personal life
Mihai Mocanu's son was also a footballer, playing for a while at Conpet Ploiești with his father as coach. He received the Honorary Citizen of Ploiești title.

Honours
Petrolul Ploiești
Divizia A: 1965–66
Omonia Nicosia
Cypriot League: 1973–74
Cypriot Cup: 1973–74

Notes

References

External links

1942 births
2009 deaths
Romanian footballers
Liga I players
Liga II players
Cypriot First Division players
FC Petrolul Ploiești players
AC Omonia players
1970 FIFA World Cup players
Association football defenders
Sportspeople from Constanța
Romania international footballers
Romanian expatriate footballers
Expatriate footballers in Cyprus
Romanian expatriate sportspeople in Cyprus
Romanian football managers
FC Petrolul Ploiești managers
CSO Plopeni managers